Mark Opitz  (born 1952) is an Australian record producer and audio engineer. He started his career with Australian Broadcasting Corporation (ABC) in 1971. He has produced AC/DC, the Angels, Australian Crawl, Cold Chisel, Divinyls and INXS. He has won the ARIA Award for Producer of the Year in 1987 and 1988. He had previously won Best Australian Producer at the Countdown Awards for his work in 1980, 1982, 1985 and 1986. On 8 June 2020 he was appointed a Member of the Order of Australia (AM) for "significant service to the performing arts, particularly to music production." In August of that year he was listed as one of The 7 Most Influential Music Producers of All Time by Mixdown Magazines David Tomisch and Will Brewster.

Early years and personal life 

Mark Opitz was born in Melbourne in 1952. His mother Shirley, his father and an older sibling had moved from Darwin in the early 1950s to suburban Upwey and then Croydon. During childhood his parents separated, he remained with his mother, living in Burwood. She worked as a nurse. His neighbour and best friend was Kym Gyngell. The family relocated to Brisbane when his parents were briefly reconciled. After the couple separated again Opitz and his sibling were cared for by various people before being placed in the Margaret Marr Memorial Home for Boys in Wynnum – run by the Methodists. While there he was subjected to emotional and physical abuse by the staff and bullying by fellow boarders. After leaving the boys home he relocated to Sydney in the early 1970s. He has four children from his two marriages. As from 2012 Opitz was married to Natalie (his second wife): they met in November 1998 at the Mushroom 25 Concert.

Career

Opitz started his career at the Australian Broadcasting Corporation's ABC TV in Sydney in 1971 as a studio trainee working on children's TV show Mr. Squiggle and rock music series GTK. Initially he aspired to be a programme director, "I started as a cameraman. I worked on music shows." He became an audio engineer. In order to become a record producer he transferred to EMI in 1974 working in the mastering department. By 1976 he was label manager for EMI's Australian division of Capitol Records. He worked as assistant producer for EMI's in-house productions.

Opitz took a position as Vanda & Young's apprentice producer at EMI Studios 301 in Sydney in 1977. Under their tutelage he worked with Albert Productions artists AC/DC, Rose Tattoo, John Paul Young and Flash and the Pan. He developed his production skills as an audio engineer, mixing engineer and record producer. His early producing jobs were on the Angels' albums Face to Face (1978) and No Exit (1979). He assisted the Angels to develop their signature sound with thick guitars, which dominated Australia's 1980s airwaves.

Warner Music's management offered Opitz the position as Head of  during 1980, while he was producing the East album for Cold Chisel. As A&R he signed Billy Field and Divinyls to the label. He also produced further albums for Cold Chisel, Richard Clapton, Swanee and the Hitmen. He left Warner in 1982 to buy Rhinoceros Studios in Sydney, with a commercial partner, and set up his own production company. Over the next five years he produced albums for Jimmy Barnes, INXS, Models, Hoodoo Gurus, Australian Crawl, Noiseworks and the Reels. During the 1980s Opitz won Australian music industry awards for his production work on six occasions: Best Australian Producer at the Countdown Awards for 1980, 1982, 1985 and 1986; as well as Producer of the Year at the ARIA Music Awards of 1987 and the following year.

Opitz was based primarily in the United States and Europe during the 1990s while working with international artists. However, he produced more INXS studio albums Welcome to Wherever You Are (1992) and Full Moon, Dirty Hearts (1993). He had accompanied the group on their international tour, which resulted in the live album, Live Baby Live (1991), as well as Live at Wembley Stadium 1991 from their performance at Wembley Stadium. In the late 1990s Michael Gudinski of Mushroom Records invited Opitz to join his executive team and oversee Australian music recording projects in readiness for the sale of Gudinski's label to News Limited. Opitz worked in various facets of Mushroom Records' business interests and produced the Mushroom 25th Anniversary series of concerts, albums and TV/VHS specials in 1998.

Opitz is included in Billboards All Time Top "Producer Encyclopaedia", which covers all genres of music. He worked with Bob Dylan on latter's Academy Award ceremony performance of "Things Have Changed" from the movie The Wonder Boys and on Kiss and Melbourne Symphony Orchestra's recording Kiss Symphony: Alive IV (2003). He has also worked with Lenny Kravitz, Ray Charles and the Beach Boys. Opitz' company The Best Seat in the House produced the INXS DVD/TV special I'm Only Looking for international release through Warner Music in the US and Universal Music for the rest of the world. This project included many interviews, mini-documentaries as well as music videos and live performance footage. He also produced the music for Kiss' US TV special/DVD release Rock the Nation in 2006 and Paul Stanley's solo project in 2007. He produced albums for Rose Tattoo, Jeff Lang, and Monique Brumby.

As of 2011 Opitz was a full voting member in all categories of both ARIA Awards in Australia and Grammy Awards in the US. He developed music programmes by merging various music genres for rock group Bad//Dreems from Adelaide. In 2016, the Australian National University (ANU) spent $12 million to establish their School of Music with Opitz as a Visiting Fellow of that department. In August 2017 he was listed as one of The 7 Most Influential Music Producers of All Time by Mixdown Magazines David Tomisch and Will Brewster.

Bibliography

Technical works 

{| class="wikitable"
|+List of technical works by Mark Opitz
|-
! Year
! Artist(s)
! Work
! Role(s)
! 
|-
|rowspan="3"| 1977 || John St Peeters || "Summer of Love" (single) || Producer || 
|-
| Reg Lindsay || Silence on the Line || Engineer || 
|-
| AC/DC || Let There Be Rock || Engineer || 
|-
|rowspan="3"| 1978 || The Angels || Face to Face || Engineer, producer || 
|-
| The Angels || After the Rain – The Tour (EP) || Producer || 
|-
| AC/DC || Powerage || Engineer || 
|-
|rowspan="3"| 1979 || The Angels || No Exit || Engineer, producer || 
|-
| The Reels || The Reels || Engineer, producer || 
|-
| The Angels || Out of the Blue (EP) || Producer || 
|-
|rowspan="2"| 1980 || Cold Chisel || East || Engineer, producer || 
|- 
| Swanee || Into the Night || Producer || 
|-
|rowspan="2" | 1981 || The Hitmen || The Hitmen || Producer || 
|-
| Cold Chisel || Swingshift || Mixer, producer || 
|-
|rowspan="5" | 1982 || Richard Clapton || The Great Escape || Producer || 
|-
| Divinyls || Monkey Grip EP || Producer || 
|-
| Cold Chisel || Circus Animals || Engineer, producer || 
|-
|INXS || Shabooh Shoobah || Engineer, producer || 
|-
| Swanee || This Time Its Different || Producer || 
|-
|rowspan="3"| 1983 || Australian Crawl || Semantics (EP) || Producer || 
|-
| Divinyls || Desperate || Producer || 
|-
| INXS || Dekadance || Engineer, mixer, producer || 
|-
|rowspan="7" | 1984 || Cold Chisel || Twentieth Century || Engineer, mixer || 
|-
| Eurogliders || This Island || Producer || 
|-
| Richard Clapton || Solidarity || Producer || 
|-
| Jimmy Barnes || Bodyswerve || Engineer, mixer, producer || 
|-
| Mental As Anything || "Apocalypso (Wiping the Smile Off Santa's Face)" (single) || Producer || 
|-
| Cold Chisel || Barking Spiders Live: 1983 || Producer || 
|-
| Deckchairs Overboard || "Walking in the Dark" (single) || Producer || 
|-
|rowspan="6"| 1985 || Divinyls || What a Life! || Producer || 
|-
| Flame Fortune || Flame Fortune (12" EP) || Producer || 
|-
| The Venetians || Step off the Edge || Producer || 
|-
| Models || Out of Mind, Out of Sight || Mixer, producer || 
|-
| Deckchairs Overboard || Deckchairs Overboard || Producer || 
|-
| Jimmy Barnes || For the Working Class Man || Producer || 
|-
|rowspan="3"| 1986 || INXS and Jimmy Barnes || "Good Times" (single) || Producer || 
|-
| Spaniards || Locked in a Dance || Producer || 
|-
| Models || Models' Media || Producer || 
|-
|rowspan="5" | 1987 || Hoodoo Gurus || Blow Your Cool! || Producer || 
|-
| Noiseworks || Noiseworks || Producer || 
|-
| INXS || Kick || Mixer, remaster || 
|-
| Jimmy Barnes || Freight Train Heart || Producer || 
|-
| Mental As Anything || Mouth to Mouth || Mixer || 
|-
|rowspan="2"| 1988 || The Saints || Prodigal Son || Mixer || 
|-
| The Venetians || Amazing World || Producer || 
|-
|rowspan="4"| 1989 || The Ocean Blue || The Ocean Blue || Producer || 
|-
| Mental As Anything || Cyclone Raymond || Producer || 
|-
| Cats in Boots || Kicked & Klawed || Producer || 
|-
| Scary Bill || Scary Bill || Producer || 
|-
|rowspan="3"| 1990 || Steelheart || Steelheart || Producer || 
|-
| Red House || Red House || Producer || 
|-
| INXS || X || Remaster, remixer || 
|-
|rowspan="2"| 1991 || INXS || Live Baby Live || Mixer, producer || 
|-
| Roxus || Nightstreet || Producer || 
|-
|rowspan="3"| 1992 || 1927 || 1927 || Producer || 
|-
| INXS || Welcome to Wherever You Are || Producer, remaster, remixer || 
|-
| Ghost of an American Airman || Life Under Giants || Mixer, producer || 
|-
| 1993 || INXS || Full Moon, Dirty Hearts || Mixer, producer || 
|-
| 1994 || INXS || "The Strangest Party (These Are the Times)" (single) || Producer || 
|-
| 1997 || Inqbator || Hatched || Mixer, producer || 
|-
|rowspan="2"| 1998 || Hunters & Collectors || Juggernaut || Mixer, producer || 
|-
| Paul Kelly || Words and Music || Producer, remixer || 
|-
|rowspan="3"| 1999 || Deadstar || Somewhere Over the Radio || Producer || 
|-
| Jimmy Barnes || Love and Fear || Engineer, mixer, producer || 
|-
| Little Angels || Little of the Past || Producer || 
|-
|rowspan="2"| 2002 || Broklyn Run || Brooklyn Run || Producer || 
|-
| Jimmy Barnes || Raw || Mastering, mixer || 
|-
| 2003 || Kiss || Kiss Symphony: Alive IV || Mixer, producer || 
|-
|rowspan="2"| 2007 || Rose Tattoo || Blood Brothers || Photographer, producer || 
|-
| Billy Thorpe || Solo – The Last Recordings || Producer || 
|-
| 2008 || Paul Stanley || One Live Kiss || Mixer || 
|-
| 2009 ||  Jeff Lang || Chimeradour || Producer ||
|-
| 2012 || Sunset Riot || Uprising || Producer ||
|-
| 2013 || Owen Campbell || The Pilgrim || Producer || 
|-
| 2017 || Black Aces || Anywhere But Here|| Producer || 
|-
| 2020 || Rose Tattoo || Outlaws || Engineer, mixer, producer || 
|-
|}

Awards and nominations
ARIA Music Awards
The ARIA Music Awards is an annual awards ceremony that recognises excellence, innovation, and achievement across all genres of Australian music. They commenced in 1987.

|-
| 1987
| himself
| Producer of the Year
| 
|-
| 1988
| himself
| Producer of the Year
| 

TV Week / Countdown AwardsCountdown was an Australian pop music TV series on national broadcaster ABC-TV from 1974–1987, it presented music awards from 1979–1987, initially in conjunction with magazine TV Week. The TV Week / Countdown Awards were a combination of popular-voted and peer-voted awards.

|-
| 1980
| himself for East'' by Cold Chisel
| Best Australian Producer
| 
|-
| 1982
| himself
| Best Australian Producer
| 
|-
| 1984
| himself for work with Australian Crawl, INXS & Divinyls
| Best Australian Producer
| 
|-
| 1985
| himself
| Best Australian Producer
| 
|-
| 1986
| himself
| Best Australian Producer
| 
|-

References 
General

  Note: Archived [on-line] copy has limited functionality.

Specific

External links 
Mark Opitz on Myspace

1952 births
Living people
ARIA Award winners
Australian record producers
People from Melbourne
INXS
Australian audio engineers
Members of the Order of Australia